Ştefan Apostol (born 17 October 1974) is a Romanian former football player, who played most of his career for FCM Bacău.

External links
 
 

1974 births
Living people
Romanian footballers
Association football defenders
Liga I players
FCM Bacău players
FC Rapid București players
FC Vaslui players
FC Botoșani players
CS Aerostar Bacău players
Cypriot First Division players
Digenis Akritas Morphou FC players
Romanian expatriate footballers
Romanian expatriate sportspeople in Cyprus
Expatriate footballers in Cyprus
Romanian football managers
FC Botoșani managers